The United States Air Force's 807th Expeditionary Air Support Operations Squadron (807 EASOS) is a combat support unit located at an undisclosed location in the Middle East. The 807 EASOS provides Tactical Command and Control of air power assets to the Joint Forces Air Component Commander and Joint Forces Land Component Commander for combat operations.

References

Air support operations squadrons of the United States Air Force